Belvedere House and Gardens is a country house located approximately  from Mullingar, County Westmeath in Ireland on the north-east shore of Lough Ennell. It was built in 1740 as a hunting lodge for Robert Rochfort, 1st Earl of Belvedere by architect Richard Cassels, one of Ireland's foremost Palladian architects. 

Although not very large, it is because of its Diocletian windows and dramatic nineteenth-century terracing. When Robert Rochfort decided to use Belvedere as his principal residence, he employed French stuccatore Barthelemij Cramillion, to execute the Rococo plasterwork ceilings which are among the most exquisite in the country. The landscaped demesne boasts the largest and most spectacular folly and spite wall in the country, The Jealous Wall, built to block off the view of his estranged brother's house nearby. There is also Victorian walled garden and many hectares of forest. The house has been fully restored and the grounds are well maintained, attracting some 160,000 visitors annually.

History
The house was initially built by Robert Rochfort as a retreat, having incarcerated his wife in their previous home at Gaulstown, for an alleged affair with his brother Arthur. Arthur was later put on trial and fined £20,000 which he could not pay. Arthur spent 18 years in debtors' prison in Dublin but was released upon Robert's death. Robert built The Jealous Wall after falling out with his brother George, who lived on the adjacent estate at Tudenham. His wife was only released on his death in 1774. The estate passed to his son George Augustus Rochfort, the 2nd Earl. He was MP for Westmeath from 1761 to 1776 and High Sheriff of Westmeath for 1762. He left for England in 1798 and died in 1814. When his widow died in 1828, Belvedere passed to her grandson Brinsley Butler, 4th Earl of Lanesborough. He rarely visited Belvedere and it was subsequently inherited on his death by his cousin Charles Brinsley Marlay in 1847. Charles moved into the house and during his time there was responsible for the alteration of the Diocletian windows on the upper façade and for the addition of the terracing. He commissioned Ninian Niven, curator of the Botanic Gardens in Glasnevin, to draw up plans for the Victorian walled garden. In the period following the second world war, Charles Howard-Bury, who was a soldier and mountaineer, restored the house and gardens. He never married and on his death in 1963, the estate was inherited by Rex Beaumont. Rex had been Howard-Bury's friend and companion for 30 years, and sold the estate to Westmeath County Council in 1982 for £250,000. Following a multimillion-pound restoration, the house and gardens have been opened to visitors. Belvedere also hosts weekend music festivals, and intimate garden theatre performances.

Gallery

See also
Spite Wall

References

External links
 Belvedere House Gardens & Park website
 Belvedere House Gardens & Park website

Houses completed in 1740
Buildings and structures in Mullingar
Forests and woodlands of the Republic of Ireland
Houses in the Republic of Ireland
Tourist attractions in County Westmeath
Historic house museums in the Republic of Ireland
Museums in County Westmeath
Gardens in County Westmeath
Buildings and structures in County Westmeath
1740 establishments in Ireland
Richard Cassels buildings